Billy the Kid (William H. Bonney, 1859–1881) was a notorious Western outlaw.

Billy the Kid may also refer to:

Films and television
Billy the Kid (1911 film), an American film directed by Laurence Trimble
Billy the Kid (1930 film), a Hollywood film
Billy the Kid (film series), a 1940s series of Western films
Billy the Kid (1941 film), a color remake of the 1930 film
Billy the Kid (1964 film), a Spanish movie by León Klimovsky
Billy the Kid (1989 film), a made-for-television movie starring Val Kilmer
Billy the Kid (2013 film), a low-budget movie starring Cody McCarver
 Billy the Kid (TV series), a 2022 TV series created by Michael Hirst

Literature
Billy the Kid (Charlton Comics), a 1955 comic book series published from the 1950s to the 1980s
Billy the Kid (Lucky Luke), a 1962 Lucky Luke comic book
Billy the Kid (novel), a 2000 children's novel by Michael Morpurgo

Music
Billy the Kid (ballet), a 1938 ballet by Aaron Copland
"Billy the Kid" (Billy Dean song)
"Billy the Kid", a 1976 single by Charlie Daniels
"Billy the Kid", a 2011 song by Dia Frampton from Red
"Billy the Kid", a 2006 song by Billy Gilman from Billy Gilman
"Billy the Kid", a song by Tom Petty and the Heartbreakers from Echo
"Billy the Kid", a song by Marty Robbins from Gunfighter Ballads and Trail Songs
William Bonney, a screamo band from South Bend, Indiana

People
 Billy Claiborne (1860–1882), American outlaw and gunfighter, a survivor of the Gunfight at the O.K. Corral
 John Miller (outlaw) 
 Billy "The Kid" Emerson (born 1925), American musician
 Antonio González Pacheco (born 1946), Spanish police inspector accused of torture during the Franco era
 Billy Pettinger (born 1982), Canadian singer performing as Billy the Kid

See also
Billy & the Kids a rock band led by Grateful Dead drummer Bill Kreutzmann
William Kidd (disambiguation), including Bill Kidd and Billy Kidd
William the Kid (disambiguation)